Michael Koch may refer to:

Michael Koch (basketball) (born 1966), German basketball coach and player
Michael Koch (film director) (born 1982), Swiss film director and screenwriter
Michael Koch (handballer) (born 1942), Swedish handball player
Michael Koch (footballer), German footballer